Nottingham Malaysian Games, known to many as Notts Games, is the largest sporting event of its kind, attracting members of Malaysian-related university societies from the length and breadth of England, Scotland, Wales and Ireland. It was first organised by the committee of Nottingham Malaysian Society in 1985 and has been since held annually. It is held at 5 different venues; University of Nottingham Sports Centre, Portland Building, Nottingham Tennis Centre, PowerLeague Nottingham and Highfields Park. It is held in conjunction with Malaysian Food Festival. There were many arising issues with the organisation of the society for the games over the 2020-2021 period. Nevertheless, the Nottingham Malaysian Society made a huge comeback with Nottingham Malaysian Games 2022.

Participated Universities

History

1985 - 2005 
The first inception of Nottingham Malaysian Games was in 1985, the year it was introduced by then NMS Committee. From 1985 until 2005, the games have started to gain interest and participation by Malaysians in United Kingdom.

2006 - 2008 
The 20th Nottingham Malaysian Games (2006) saw one of the biggest number of dignitaries present for the event, with then Higher Education Minister Datuk Mustapa Mohamed, accompanied by Education Minister Datuk Seri Hishammuddin Tun Hussein and Domestic Trade and Consumer Affairs Minister Datuk Shafie Apdal, was given the honour to launch the game at the sports centre. The event also began to attract participation from Ireland. Squash was introduced in 2006.
Two vice-chancellors from Malaysia were also present, with an estimated record number of 5,200 students from more than 60 universities.

In 2007 and 2008, no significant changes were done to the organisation and structure of the Games, but high quality was maintained throughout the running of the games in both years. In 2008, the event was officiated by Datuk Seri Mohamed Khaled Nordin, Higher Education Minister of Malaysia.

2009 (Silver Jubilee) 
In 2009, the 25th Year celebration was held, breaking the record of number of dignitaries, participants and supporters, with more than half of Malaysians currently in UK and Ireland congregating in Nottingham for the event. The event was graced with the attendance of the Minister of Youth and Sports, Dato' Ahmad Shabery Cheek, representing Dato' Sri Najib Tun Razak, the Prime Minister of Malaysia. During the event, he complimented the leadership values portrayed by the committee in organising such a large event with little help from sponsoring companies and the Government

Delegates present during the event were:
 the Minister of Youth and Sports, Dato' Ahmad Shabery Cheek, representing Dato' Sri Najib Tun Razak, the Prime Minister of Malaysia
 Professor David Greenaway, Vice Chancellor of University of Nottingham
 delegates from Malaysian Students' Department UK and Ireland
 delegates from University of Nottingham International Office and Vice Chancellor's Office
 delegates from Malaysian Ministry of Youth and Sports

2009's Motto read: New Games, New Ground, New Generation.

The year 2009 also saw the largest number of media representatives, including:
 TV3, Malaysia's leading TV Network
 MadGrapeTV
 New Straits Times Press

Results 

 Squash was introduced in 2006.
 Tennis, Congkak and Batu Seremban were introduced in 2009.

Oath 
The sportsmanship oath is recited before the start of the games, and was first introduced in 2008.

We, the participants of Nottingham Malaysian Games, vow to abide to the good virtues of sportsmanship and conform to the etiquette of sport. We shall express our aspiration for sports with proper consideration for fairness and equality, and shall practise the following qualities of a good sportsman:

 Full commitment to participation 
 Respect and concern for rules and officials
 Respect and concern for social conventions
 Respect and concern for the opponent 
 Avoid poor attitudes toward participation

Kami, para peserta Nottingham Malaysian Games, berikrar akan patuh kepada nilai-nilai murni serta etiket kesukanan. Kami akan melahirkan semangat kesukanan dengan mengambil kira keadilan dan kesaksamaan, serta akan taat kepada prinsip-prinsip berikut:

 Komitmen kepada penyertaan
 Penghormatan kepada peraturan serta pegawai sukan
 Penghormatan kepada konvensyen sosial
 Penghormatan kepada pihak lawan
 Penghindaran sikap-sikap negatif terhadap penyertaan

See also
 University of Nottingham
 Nottingham Malaysian Games Website

References

External links
 NMG 2009 Official Page
 NMG 2009 Official Trailer Video
 NMG 2007 Official Page
 Press release
 NMG '07 Pictures
 Nottingham Malaysian Games 2008 Opening Video
 Nottingham Malaysian Society

University of Nottingham